The Great Eau is a river in Lincolnshire, England, rising from the Chalk Streams of the Lincolnshire Wolds and running to Saltfleet Haven on the coast.  It is joined by its companion stream, the Long Eau.

The placename element Eau for a river is common in Lincolnshire and comes not from the French, but from Old English Ea – a river, related to modern Germanic Aa.

References

External links

Great Eau